The Paraíba gubernatorial election will be held on 5 October 2014 to elect the next governor of the state of Paraíba, Brazil. If no candidate receives more than 50% of the vote, a second-round runoff election will be held on 26 October.  Governor Ricardo Coutinho is running for reelection.

Candidates

Opinion Polling

References

2014 Brazilian gubernatorial elections
Paraíba gubernatorial elections
October 2014 events in South America